Le Kremlin–Bicêtre is a station of the Paris Métro, serving the Villejuif branch of Line 7.

History 
Le Kremlin–Bicêtre opened on 10 December 1982 following an extension from Maison Blanche and served as the southern terminus of the new branch of line 7 until 28 February 1985 when it was extended to Villejuif Louis Aragon.

This station's noticeable name, often confused with the official residence of the President of the Russian Federation, is actually the name of the commune it is located in. It is derived from a tavern "Au sergent du Kremlin", a meeting place for French war veterans around 1813, and Bicêtre, an alteration of Winchester, England, the bishop who has owned property here.

In 2019, the station was used by 4,062,243 passengers, making it the 112th busiest of the Métro network out of 302 stations.

In 2020, the station was used by 2,244,686 passengers amidst the COVID-19 pandemic, making it the 103rd busiest of the Métro network out of 305 stations.

Passenger services

Access 
The station has 2 entrances:
 Entrance 1: Avenue de Fontainebleau / Avenue Eugène Thomas Hôpital de Bicêtre
 Entrance 2: Avenue de Fontainebleau

Station layout

Platforms 
Le Kremlin–Bicêtre has a standard configuration with 2 tracks separated by 2 side platforms and surmounted by a mezzanine. The name of the station is written in Parisine font on enamelled plates. Lighting is provided by suspended luminous globes. Small ceramic tiles of a white and red colour, placed vertically, cover the walls as well as the tunnel exits. The furniture is in the Motte style in a red colour.

Other connections 
The station is also served by lines 47, 131, 185, and 323 of the RATP bus network, by line v7 of the Valouette bus network, and at night, by lines N15 and N22 of the Noctilien bus network.

Nearby 
 Centre commercial Okabé
 Cimetière du Kremlin-Bicêtre
 Hôpital Bicêtre

Gallery

References 

Paris Métro stations in Le Kremlin-Bicêtre
Railway stations in France opened in 1982